Far East University is located in Gamgok-myeon, Eumseong County, North Chungcheong province, South Korea. It was founded in 1998 by Dr. Taek-hee Lyu. The school flower is the chrysanthemum.

History

Far East University opened its doors on March 5, 1998. Its first graduating class numbered only 164 students but since then, it has grown rapidly, and by 2009 enrollment had topped 5000.

Organization

The undergraduate courses of Far East University are divided among eight colleges and seven independent departments:

 College of Management
 Department of Hotel Tourism
 College of Broadcasting and Multimedia
 College of Social Welfare
 College of Law
 College of Information Communication
 College of Design
 College of Teaching
 Department of Secondary School Special Education
 Department of English
 Department of Japanese
 Department of Chinese
 Department of Theater
 Department of Sports and Leisure
 Department of Electronic Commerce
 Department of Flight Operation

See also
Education in South Korea
List of colleges and universities in South Korea

External links
Official school website, in English
Official school website, in Korean

Universities and colleges in North Chungcheong Province
Eumseong County
1998 establishments in South Korea
Educational institutions established in 1998